Georgina Sophie Twigg  (born 21 November 1990) is an English international field hockey player and an Olympic gold medalist at the 2016 Summer Olympics.

Hockey career 
She plays club hockey in the Women's England Hockey League Premier Division for Surbiton.  Twigg played as a midfielder for England and Great Britain from 2010 to 2016.

In that time, results have included:

 Gold at the Rio 2016 Summer Olympics,
 Gold at the 2015 European Championship
 Silver at the 2014 Glasgow Commonwealth Games,
 Silver medal with Great Britain at the 2012 Champions Trophy in Argentina,
 Bronze with England at the 2010 Commonwealth Games in Delhi, scoring the winning goal in the Bronze medal match,
 Bronze medal with England at the 2010 Argentina World Cup,
 Bronze medal at the London 2012 Summer Olympics.
She was named England Hockey's Young Performance Player of the Year in 2010, 2011, 2012 & 2013.  She made her international debut at the 2010 Champions Trophy and was the youngest player in Great Britain's 2012 Olympic squad.  She has played for Surbiton, Clifton Robinsons, University of Bristol, Cannock and Lincoln. She announced her official retirement from international hockey in July 2018.

Personal life
Twigg is from Lincoln, and attended Repton School.

Since 2012 Twigg has been in a relationship with Iain Lewers, the England/Great Britain men's international. In 2019 they became engaged.

She arrived at Bristol University at the age of 17 in September 2008 to read law.  While an undergraduate she played hockey for university and Clifton.  Because of her link to Bristol, she was one of the Olympic torchbearers when the torch was carried through Bristol.  Following the 2012 Summer Olympics, her home village post box was painted bronze; it was repainted the official red colour by the Royal Mail.

Retirement
In 2016, she indefinitely suspended her international hockey career, citing her professional career as a trainee city lawyer. She announced her official retirement in July 2018.

References

External links 
 

 Official website
 The Road To Rio 2016 
 
 

1990 births
Living people
English female field hockey players
Field hockey players at the 2012 Summer Olympics
Olympic field hockey players of Great Britain
Olympic bronze medallists for Great Britain
Olympic gold medallists for Great Britain
Alumni of the University of Bristol
Olympic medalists in field hockey
Medalists at the 2012 Summer Olympics
Medalists at the 2016 Summer Olympics
Sportspeople from Lincoln, England
Field hockey players at the 2014 Commonwealth Games
Commonwealth Games silver medallists for England
Commonwealth Games bronze medallists for England
Field hockey players at the 2016 Summer Olympics
Field hockey players at the 2010 Commonwealth Games
People educated at Repton School
Commonwealth Games medallists in field hockey
Members of the Order of the British Empire
Surbiton Hockey Club players
Cannock Hockey Club players
Women's England Hockey League players
Female field hockey midfielders
Medallists at the 2010 Commonwealth Games
Medallists at the 2014 Commonwealth Games